Mawsynram is a town in the East Khasi Hills district of Meghalaya state in Northeastern India, 69 kilometres from Shillong, the state capital. Mawsynram receives the highest rainfall in India.
Mawsynram received 745.2 mm of rainfall on 19 August 2015, probably the highest rainfall received by the town in recent times. On June 17th 2022, Mawsynram set a new record by receiving 1003.6 mm in a span of 24 hours which has now become its highest single day record for the month of June and for its all time single day record beating its former record of 944.7 mm on June 7th 1966.

Location

Mawsynram is located at 25° 18′ N, 91° 35′ E, at an altitude of about 1,400 meters (4,600 ft), 15 km west of Cherrapunji, in the Khasi Hills in the state of Meghalaya (India).

Climate and rainfall
Under the Köppen climate classification, Mawsynram features a subtropical highland climate (Cwb) with an extraordinarily showery, rainy and long monsoonal season and a short dry season. Based on the data of a recent few decades, it appears to be the wettest place in the world, or the place with the highest average annual rainfall. Mawsynram receives over 10,000 millimeters of rain in an average year, and the vast majority of the rain it gets falls during the monsoon months. A comparison of rainfalls for Cherrapunji and Mawsynram for some years is given in Table 1.
Mawsynram receives the highest rainfall in India. Although it is reportedly the wettest place on Earth, with an average annual rainfall of 11,872 millimetres (467.4 in), this claim is disputed by Lloró, Colombia, which reported an average yearly rainfall of 12,717 millimetres (500.7 in) between 1952 and 1989 and López de Micay, also in Colombia, which reported 12,892 mm (507.6 in) per year between 1960 and 2012. According to the records observed by the Indian Meterological Department, it was seen that while its neighbour, Cherrapunji is having a significant decreasing trend in rainfall, Mawsynram on the other hand is experiencing a slight increase in its rainfall pattern which put its average annual rainfall from 1950 to 2000 at 12393 mm and from 2000 to 2020 at 12120 mm. The precipitation table below shows the average monthly record from 1950-2000.

Primarily due to the high altitude, it seldom gets truly hot in Mawsynram. Average monthly temperatures range from around 11 °C in January to just above 20 °C in August. The village also experiences a brief but noticeably drier season from December until February, when monthly precipitation on average does not exceed . The little precipitation during the village's "low sun" season is something that is shared by many areas with this type of climate.

The following table is a comparison of rainfalls for Cherrapunji and Mawsynram between 1970 and 2010.

 
 

Three reasons can be cited for high rainfall at Mawsynram:
The warm moist winds of the northward-moving air from the Bay of Bengal during the monsoon, which cover an extensive area but are forced to converge into the narrower zone over the Khasi Hills, thus concentrating their moisture.
The alignment of the Khasi Hills (east to west) places them directly in the path of the airflow from the Bay of Bengal, producing a significant uplift (plus cooling, further condensation and thus more rain).
Finally, uplift over the Khasi Hills is virtually continuous in the monsoon period because the lifted air is constantly being pulled up by vigorous winds in the upper atmosphere; hence, the rainfall is more or less continuous.

Natural landmarks
Located in Mawsynram, is a cave named Mawjymbuin, known for its stalagmites. Inside this cave is a pair of notable speleothems - stalactites shaped like a cow's udder over a large stalagmite. The area is known for its many caves, both commercialized and non-commercialized.

References 

 Middleton, Nick. Going to Extremes. Pan, 2012.

External links
 The Tribune (India) - The dispute between Mawsynram and Cherrapunji for the title of "wettest place on earth"

Villages in East Khasi Hills district
Weather extremes of Earth
Geography of Meghalaya